Alexis Guendouz born 26 January 1996) is a professional footballer who plays as a goalkeeper for CR Belouizdad. Born in France, he represents Algeria at international level.

Club career
On 25 July 2018, Guendouz renewed his contract with AS Saint-Étienne until 2020 and was loaned to National 1 club Pau FC for one season. On 4 July 2019, he renewed a new loan in Pau FC for another season. and helped them to achieve the promotion to Ligue 2. to end his career with the club, with a total of 57 matches and clean sheets in 21 games. In September 2020, hesigned a two-year contract with USM Alger coming from AS Saint-Étienne for 15,000 euro. Guendouz declared that his ambition is to win titles and join the Algeria national team. After the end of his contract with USM Alger Guendouz announced his departure via a post on his official Instagram account. Guendouz engagement with the Algerian champion CR Belouizdad in a contract for two seasons.

International career
In June 2022, Guendouz was called up by Madjid Bougherra for the first time to the Algeria A' national team to the Four Nations tournament; his first match was against Niger and ended with a 1–0 win. On January 2, 2023, Guendouz was selected for the 28-man squad to participate in the 2022 African Nations Championship.

Career statistics

Club

References

External links
 

1996 births
Living people
Algerian footballers
Association football goalkeepers
USM Alger players
Algerian Ligue Professionnelle 1 players
Algeria A' international footballers
Footballers from Saint-Étienne
French footballers
Pau FC players
AS Saint-Étienne players
French sportspeople of Algerian descent
2022 African Nations Championship players